Karol Beffa, born on October 27, 1973 in Paris, is a French and Swiss composer and pianist.

Biography 
Karol Beffa had a general education along with music studies, at the Ecole Normale Supérieure in Paris, consisting of history, English, philosophy (Master's at Cambridge University, Trinity College) and mathematics.

Beffa studied harmony, counterpoint, fugue, music theory, improvisation and composition at the Conservatoire de Paris (CNSMDP), where he won 8 First prizes. He taught at the Sorbonne and at the Ecole Polytechnique. He wrote his PhD (2003) on György Ligeti's Etudes for piano. Since 2004, he is an Associate Professor at the Ecole Normale Supérieure...

As a composer, his catalogue consists of some hundred works, which have been performed in France, China, Germany, Great Britain, Italy, Russia, the United States and Japan by ensembles as Maîtrise de Radio France, Chœur de l’Orchestre de Paris, Cambridge Voices, Ensemble Notabu, and the leading orchestras (Orchestre Philharmonique de Radio France, Orchestre National de France, Orchestre de Paris, Saint Petersburg Philharmonic, London Symphony Orchestra, Deutsche Kammerphilharmonie Bremen...). His composing career is closely linked to that of the pianist

His works are to be found in the repertoire of the leading orchestras, and of musicians such as Gautier Capuçon, Renaud Capuçon, Emmanuel Ceysson, Bertrand Chamayou, Karine Deshayes, Victor Julien-Laferrière, Nathan Laube, Marie-Pierre Langlamet, Anneleen Lenaerts, Paul Meyer, Edgar Moreau, Andreas Ottensamer, Akiko Suwanai, Kristjan Järvi, Paavo Järvi or the Modigliani Quartet and Ébène Quartet. He has been composer in residence with the Orchestre National du Capitole de Toulouse from 2006 to 2009.

He was named an Officier des Arts et des Lettres and was Chair of Artistic Creation at the College de France (2012-2013)

Awards 

 2013 : composer of the year - Victoires de la musique classique.
 2016 : Grand prix lycéen des compositeurs .
 2017 : Grand Prix de la musique symphonique de la SACEM
 2018 : composer of the year - Victoires de la musique classique.

Discography

As a performer 

 2008 : Improvisations, Intrada 
 2008 : Masques, Mirages, with Johan Farjot, Triton
 2011 : Songs, Ensemble Contraste, Contraste/Naïve
 2013 : Bach transcriptions, Ensemble Contraste, La dolce volta
 2013 : Alcools, Le Bestiaire, improvisations by Karol Beffa (Apollinaire read by Bernard Métraux), Gallimard
 2014 : Miroir(s), by Karol Beffa, Johan Farjot, Raphaël Imbert and Arnaud Thorette, Naïve arrangements de Purcell, Bach, Mozart, Erik Satie, Karol Beffa, Johan Farjot, Raphaël Imbert
 2015 : Libres, by Karol Beffa and Raphaël Imbert, JazzVillage/Harmonia Mundi
 2015 : Into the Dark : Concerto pour alto, Concerto pour harpe, Nuit obscure, Dédale, with Johan Farjot, Arnaud Thorette, Karine Deshayes, Emmanuel Ceysson, Aparte
 2016 : Tous en cœur, ensemble Contraste
 2016 : Blow Up, musique de chambre avec vents, Indesens
 2017 : Le Roi qui n'aimait pas la musique : text by Mathieu Laine, with Patrick Bruel (reader), Renaud Capuçon (violin), Edgar Moreau (cello), Paul Meyer (clarinet) and Karol Beffa (piano), livre-disque Gallimard jeunesse
 2018 : En Blanc et Noir, Indesens : piano improvisations
 2019 : De l'autre côté du miroir, Indesens : piano improvisations
 2020 : Tohu Bohu, Blow in, Indesens : by Karol Beffa (piano), Saxo Voce
 2020 : Talisman, Destroy, Klarthe : by Karol Beffa (piano), Quatuor Renoir

As a composer 
Is written first the name of the music record, then the name of the compositions by Karol Beffa which appear on the music record.

 2005 : Inventions : Masques I et II, by Renaud and Gautier Capuçon, Virgin Classics
 2006 : Dutilleux : Sonate – Beffa : 6 études, Voyelles pour piano, by Lorène de Ratuld, Ame Son
 2006 : Debussy en miroir : Trois Études pour piano, by Dana Ciocarlie, Triton
 2006 : Tenebrae  : Metropolis, by Arnaud Thorette, and Johan Farjot, Accord/Universal
 2008 : Masques : Les ombres qui passent, Mirages, Supplique, Manhattan, Masques 1 & 2, Milonga, ensemble Contraste and Karol Beffa, Triton
 2008 : Duo Romain Leleu et Julien Le Pape : Subway, by Romain Leleu and Julien Le Pape, Indesens
 2008 : Après une lecture de Bach..., by Marina Chiche, Intrada
 2008 : Anneleen Lenaerts : Éloge de l’ombre, by Anneleen Lenaerts, Egon Records
 2009 : Bachianas et transcriptions : Erbarme dich, by David Bismuth, 
 2010 : Fantasy : Buenos Aires, Feeling Brass quintet, Aparte
 2012 : L’œil du Loup, Gallimard, with l'Orchestre de chambre de Paris (text from Daniel Pennac)
 2013 : Ground IV : Feux d’artifice, by the Quatuor de clarinettes Vendôme, Indesens
 2014 : Miroir(s) : Chinatown, "Je t'invoque", "Cathédrales", par Karol Beffa, Johan Farjot, Raphaël Imbert, Arnaud Thorette, Naive
 2014 : [R]évolution : Suite pour piano, by Vanessa Benelli Mosell, Decca
 2014 : Saxophone Conversations : Obsession, by Alicja Wolynczyk, DUX
 2015 : Trumpet concertos : Concerto pour trompette et cordes, by Romain Leleu (trompette), Orchestre d’Auvergne, dir. Roberto Forés Veses, Aparte
 2015 : French touch : Five o'clock, by the Klarthe Quintet, Klarthe
 2015 : Into the Dark : Concerto pour alto, Concerto pour harpe, Dark, Nuit obscure, Dédale, with Johan Farjot, Arnaud Thorette, Karine Deshayes, Emmanuel Ceysson et Karol Beffa, Aparte
 2016 : Blow Up, musique de chambre avec vents, : Blow up, Éloge de l'ombre, Paysages d'ombres, Subway, Concerto pour trompette, Feux d'artifice, Indesens avec l'Orchestre de la Garde républicaine dir. by Sébastien Billard, Éric Aubier, Vincent Lucas, le quatuor Jean-Yves Fourmeau, l'ensemble Initium...
 2017 : Itinérances musicales : Concerto pour trompette, by Guy Touvron, Ligia Digital
 2017 : Pulse : Les Météores, by le quatuor Eclisses, Advitam Records
 2017 : Le Roi qui n'aimait pas la musique : conte musical, text by Mathieu Laine, with Patrick Bruel (reader), Renaud Capuçon (violin), Edgar Moreau (cello), Paul Meyer (clarinet) and Karol Beffa (piano), livre-disque Gallimard jeunesse
 2017 : The World's best loved classical piano pieces : "Erbarme dich", by Alena Cherny
 2018 : Crime : Fireworks for saxophones quartet, by the Whoop Group, Sarton Records
 2018 : Les Doudous lyriques : Dans le labyrinthe et L'Enfant dort for mixa choir a cappella, by le Chœur 43, OutHere
 2018 : Douze Etudes : for piano, by Tristan Pfaff
 2019 : Les Maîtres Sorciers : Mémorial : for harmony orchestra, by la Musique des gardiens de la paix, dir. Gildas Harnois, Hafabra
 2019 : A Kind of Wind, Obsession, Indesens : by Nicolas Prost (saxophone)
 2020 : Tohu Bohu, Blow in, Indesens : by Karol Beffa (piano), Saxo Voce
 2020 : Musique française pour harpe, violon et violoncelle, Soleil noir, La Ferme ! Records : by Trio Jenlis
 2020 : Talisman, Les Ruines circulaires, Talisman, "Destroy", "Tenebrae", "Le Bateau ivre", Klarthe : by Orchestre national de France, Orchestre philharmonique de Radio France, Karol Beffa (piano), Quatuor Renoir

As an actor 
Karol Beffa was a child actor between the ages of 7 and 12, between 1981 (7 years old) and 1989 (14 years old).

Cinema 
 1983 : Femmes de personne, by Christopher Frank : Arnaud, the son of Marthe Keller and Pierre Arditi
 1984 : La Septième Cible, de Claude Pinoteau : le petit Pierre, the son of Lino Ventura
 1987 : Dernière Fugue, by Miguel Vassy
 2007 : Sur ta joue ennemie, by Jean-Xavier de Lestrade : a doctor
 2013 : Je ne suis pas mort, de Mehdi Ben Attia : professor Berthier
 2019 : Le Chant du loup, de Antonin Baudry : marine officer

Television 

 1981 : L’Enfant de cœur, by Jacques Cornet : Jean-Baptiste
 1982 : Délit de fuite, by Paul Seban : Jean, the son of Aurore Clément and Jean-Luc Bideau
 1982 : Mozart, by Marcel Bluwal : young Mozart (édition DVD)
 1982 : Paris-Saint-Lazare, by Marco Pico : one of the Belleau's son
 1982 : Le Crime de Pierre Lacaze, by Jean Delannoy
 1983 : Dans la citadelle, by Peter Kassovitz : Jérôme Barjols, the son of Claude Rich
 1983 : Merci Sylvestre, by Serge Korber : Gaspard
 1984 : Camille ma sœur, by Olivier Descamps: Olivier
 1984 : Image interdite, by Jean-Daniel Simon : Tommy Guy
 1984 : Quidam, by Gérard Marx
 1989 : Les Millionnaires du jeudi, by Claude Grinberg
 2015 : The Darwinners (episode "Les piano-sapiens"), by Jul : the piano teacher (voice)

Theatre 

 1983 : La Bonne Âme du Se-Tchouan, by Bertolt Brecht, directed by Giorgio Strehler
 1984 : Liberté à Brême, by Rainer Werner Fassbinder, directed by Jean-Louis Hourdin
 1985 : Grand-père by Remo Forlani, directed by Michel Fagadau : the grandson
 1985-86 : La Tragédie de Macbeth by William Shakespeare, directed by Jean-Pierre Vincent : the young Macduff

Opera 

 1983 : Let's Make an Opera (Le Petit Ramoneur), by Benjamin Britten
 1983 : Le Garçon qui a grandi trop vite, by Gian Carlo Menotti

Selected publications
 Beffa, Karol (2016). György Ligeti. Paris: Artheme Fayard.

References

External links

Living people
1973 births
French composers
Ligeti scholars